Music for the Amorphous Body Study Center is an EP by Stereolab, created in collaboration with New York sculptor Charles Long. The songs became part of Long's exhibit, complementing each of his sculptures. The album was initially available only at the exhibit in a pressing of 1500; another limited pressing was later released in stores but it is now out of print. All tracks were included in the compilation album Aluminum Tunes: Switched On, Vol. 3.

Track listing

The untitled track is an instrumental reprise of "The Extension Trip". On the Aluminum Tunes compilation, tracks 6 and 7 are combined into one track.

References

External links
The Amorphous Body Study Center (Official site)

1995 EPs
Stereolab EPs